Královo Pole (German: Königsfeld, in English meaning "King's Field") is a large district of the Czech city of Brno, north from the city centre.

History 

The first written record of Královo Pole comes from 1240, as a village (or literally a field) belonging to the king. A Carthusian monastery was established here in late 14th century.

Rapid development took place during the second half of the 19th century. It was started by the building of a sugar mill, followed by other industries, especially the Královopolská machine works. In 1885, Královo Pole was connected to the railway. In 1905 the settlement became a town (city). Soon after the World War I it became a part of Brno. While the oldest part of Královo Pole down at the Ponávka brook retained its village look, the newly built-up area on a slope ascending westwards developed a cohesive urbanistic structure centered in the Slovanské náměstí ("The Slavic Square"), with Art Nouveau city blocks and functionalistic family houses.

After World War II there was another development, housing estates were built south and later also north around. The railway with the station were relocated and some adjacent streets and blocks were rearranged.

Famous buildings 

 Old monastery of Carthusians – today belongs to and has been reconstructed by the Faculty of Information Technology, University of Technology Brno.
 IT park of the city and several university grounds.
 IBM's office in Czech Republic.
 Red Hat's office in Czechoslovakia.

Transportation 
Královo Pole is connected with the Brno centre by several tram lines and one trolleybus line. Another trolleybus line provides a tangential connection with city districts in the west. The Brno-Královo Pole railway station is served by local passenger trains and fast trains Brno-Prague (via Havlíčkův Brod). A bus terminal is located in front of the station, with bus lines to the northern outskirts of Brno. The Brno outer ring road is tunneled west-east under the district and at the tunnel portals it crosses radial highways leading to Svitavy.

External links 

Brno
Neighbourhoods in the Czech Republic